Nathan Barrett (born 4 February 1976) is a former Australian politician who represented the Northern Territory Legislative Assembly seat of Blain from 2014 to 2016.

Background and early career
Barrett was born in Darwin, and has lived in Palmerston for over twenty years. He was a port worker and teacher before entering politics.

Political career

|}
Barrett was elected at a by-election held on 12 April 2014 as a member of the governing Country Liberal Party. The vacancy was caused by the resignation of former Chief Minister Terry Mills. Although Blain, like most seats in the Palmerston area, had historically been CLP heartland, the by-election came at a difficult time for the CLP government. A week after the writ was issued, three indigenous CLP MPs defected to the crossbench. Had Barrett lost, the CLP would have been forced into a minority government. Ultimately, Barrett won, though the CLP suffered a swing of over 10 percent.

In February 2016, Barrett was promoted to Cabinet as Minister for Sport and Recreation, Minister for Young Territorians, and Minister Assisting the Treasurer. He was slated to become Treasurer after the 2016 estimates hearings.  However, on 10 June, when Northern Territory News reported that he had sent a video of himself engaging in a sex act to a constituent with whom he had been having an affair, Barrett resigned from Cabinet.

On 12 June, under growing pressure from the CLP's organisational wing, he announced that he would not contest the upcoming election. He then resigned from the CLP on 28 June 2016, and served out the rest of his term as an independent. In a speech announcing his move to the crossbench, he accused his political enemies of resorting to a base attack to bring him down. At that election, Blain was won by Barrett's predecessor, Mills, who ran as an independent.

See also

Members of the Northern Territory Legislative Assembly, 2012–2016

References

1976 births
Living people
Members of the Northern Territory Legislative Assembly
Country Liberal Party members of the Northern Territory Legislative Assembly
Independent members of the Northern Territory Legislative Assembly
Australian schoolteachers
21st-century Australian politicians